= Cork Safety Alerts =

Digital news source based in Cork, Ireland

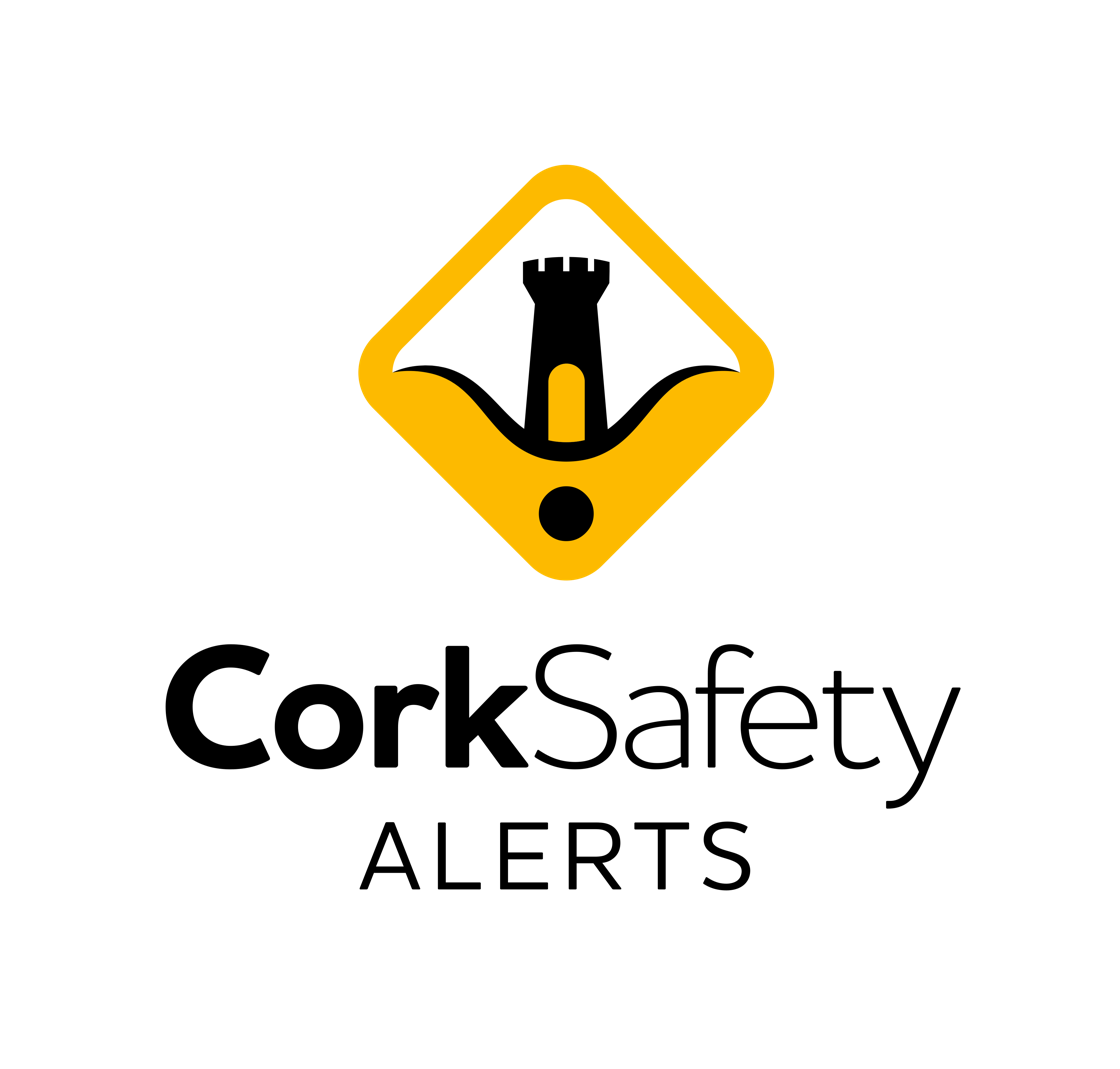
- Formation: 2013
- Founder: Patrick O'Leary
- Volunteers: 5
- Website: https://corksafetyalerts.com

Cork Safety Alerts is a digital news source based in Cork, Ireland. The volunteer run team collates and publishes general updates on traffic, travel and other non-editorialised news local to Cork. The Cork Safety Alerts team consists of 5 volunteer administrators.

Members of the public are encouraged to submit 'alerts' to the team via their social media channels such as Facebook, Twitter and Instagram, via their website or a freephone number.

== History ==
Established in early 2013 as a Facebook page called Cork Potholes, it was set up with an aim to highlight the damage on local roads in Cork. Cork Potholes gained a large following in a short period of time. In late 2013 the Cork Potholes Facebook page was changed to Cork Road Safety, and subsequently to Cork Safety Alerts in 2014.

Cork Safety Alerts gained a large following during the winter storms of 2013 and 2014, and become one of the largest groups on Facebook posting updates on traffic and flooding in both the county and city of Cork.

In 2014, the team behind Cork Safety Alerts ran a crowdfunding drive to develop a mobile application for release on the iOS and Android platforms. Following this funding campaign, and with the assistance of local app developers, the Cork Safety Alerts mobile apps were released on both iOS and Android platforms. The apps were discontinued a year later due to a lack of funding.

On 30th March 2023, Cork Safety Alerts re-launched their mobile application to the iOS platform. The app allows users to stay up-to-date with the latest news in Cork, including; traffic updates, weather warnings, local news and community area alerts. Users can also submit incident reports to the Cork Safety Alert team, allowing for quick and efficient communication and publication.

== Achievements ==
Cork Safety Alerts was nominated in the Cork Chamber 2020 Digital Marketing Awards under the category 'Best use of Digital Marketing for the Greater Good.' It was previously nominated, in the same category, at the 2018 and 2019 Cork Chamber digital marketing awards.
